Chryseobacterium taklimakanense  is a Gram-negative and rod-shaped bacteria from the genus of Chryseobacterium.

References

Further reading 
 <

External links
Type strain of Chryseobacterium taklimakanense at BacDive -  the Bacterial Diversity Metadatabase

taklimakanense
Bacteria described in 2013